The University of Mary Washington (UMW) is a public liberal arts university in Fredericksburg, Virginia. Founded in 1908 as the Fredericksburg Teachers College, the institution was named Mary Washington College in 1938 after Mary Ball Washington, mother of the first president of the United States, George Washington. The General Assembly of Virginia changed the college's name to the University of Mary Washington in 2004 to reflect the addition of graduate and professional programs to the central undergraduate curriculum, as well as the establishment of more than one campus.

Each year, students pursue more than 60 majors and programs of graduate and undergraduate study through the university's three colleges: Arts and Sciences, Business, and Education. One third of UMW's undergraduate students study abroad before graduation, taking advantage of 121 study abroad programs in 56 countries.

History
On March 14, 1908, Virginia Governor Claude A. Swanson signed into law legislation for the establishment of the new State Normal and Industrial School for Women. It was called Fredericksburg Teachers College. The institution was renamed Mary Washington College in 1938 after Mary Ball Washington, mother of the first president of the United States of America, George Washington, and longtime resident of Fredericksburg.

In 1944 the college became associated with the University of Virginia as its women's college. Until that time, the University of Virginia had not admitted women as undergraduates, except in its education and nursing programs, although its postgraduate programs were coeducational. Following UVA's transition to coeducational status in 1970, the Virginia General Assembly reorganized Mary Washington College in 1972 as a separate, coeducational institution.

In 1988, the University's Center for Historic Preservation established the Historic Preservation Book Prize, awarded annually by a jury of preservation academics and professionals to the book with the most potential for breaking new ground and positively impacting the discipline of historic preservation in the United States. Since that time, the Prize has gone to David Lowenthal, Roy Rosenzweig, Elizabeth Blackmar, Mike Wallace, Richard Longstreth, Francoise Astorg Bollack, Catherine Fleming Bruce (the first African-American awardee) and Thomas Hubka, among others.

The General Assembly of Virginia enacted legislation changing the college's name to University of Mary Washington on March 19, 2004, to reflect the addition of master's degree programs and the establishment of more than one campus.

The university's first LEED-certified building, CGPS North Building, was built in 2007. The university houses stops along the route of the Fredericksburg Regional Transit System (FRED). The school signed an Energy Performance Contract with the energy service company NORESCO from 2005 to 2007, enabling the campus to install water saving devices which reduced campus water consumption by 50%. NORESCO also installed low energy light fixtures, occupant sensors, HVAC controls, and completed replacement of leaking condensate piping.

In 2022 the University of Mary Washington was added to the Princeton Review's list of Best Colleges.

Academics

The University of Mary Washington is a public liberal arts university accredited by the Southern Association of Colleges and Schools. It is not a research university, but instead focuses on undergraduate education.

Much of UMW's Fredericksburg campus is located on Marye's Heights, a steep hill which, like Sunken Road (the campus' northeastern boundary), played an important role in the 1862 Battle of Fredericksburg. The campus is within walking distance to the historic downtown with shops, restaurants and the Rappahannock River. Other campuses are Stafford Campus, seven miles north of Fredericksburg, and Dahlgren Campus, near the Naval Surface Warfare Center Dahlgren Division.

UMW has five pre-professional programs: pre-dental, pre-law, pre-med, pre-pharmacy, and pre-veterinary. Bachelor's degrees include a Bachelor of Science, Bachelor of Arts, and Bachelor of Science in Business Administration in addition to two degree completion programs – a Bachelor of Science in Nursing (BSN) and a Bachelor of Liberal Studies (BLS). Master's degrees include a Master of Business Administration (MBA), Master of Education (M.Ed.), Master of Education for Professional Development or Added Endorsement (M.Ed.), Master of Science in Elementary Education (M.S.) and a Master of Geospatial Analysis (MSGA). UMW also offers a Geographic Information Science certificate.

First-year seminar courses allow students to explore nontraditional topics in nontraditional ways. While topics vary, classes are all capped at 15 students, focus on the development of writing and speaking skills and use active, discussion-based formats. Previous first-year seminars have included "Beyond the Selfie: Exploring Digital Identities," "Cold Case: Theatre Mysteries," "The Art of Mathematics," "Race & Revolution," and "Science and Technology – Because We Can, Should We?"

Many UMW students study abroad before graduation. The university offers 121 approved programs in 56 countries, five exchange programs, and more than 15 programs led by UMW faculty during spring breaks and summer sessions.

Administration
By statute of the Code of Virginia, the University of Mary Washington is governed by a Board of Visitors, one member of which is elected every two years to serve as Rector. The UMW Board of Visitors is composed of twelve members appointed by the Governor of Virginia and confirmed by the General Assembly. At least six members of the Board must be alumni of the university, and no more than three may be nonresidents of Virginia. Each member serves a term of four years and may be eligible for reappointment to one successive term.

Troy Paino arrived at UMW July 1, 2016 as its tenth and current president. Prior to coming to UMW, Paino served for six years as president of Truman State University in Kirksville, Missouri.

Past presidents
 Edward H. Russell (1908–1919)
 Algernon B. Chandler, Jr. (1919–1928)
 Morgan L. Combs (1929–1955)
 Grellet C. Simpson (1956–1974)
 Prince B. Woodard (1974–1982)
 William M. Anderson, Jr. (1983–2006)
 William J. Frawley (2006–2007)
 Judy G. Hample (2008–2010)
 Richard V. Hurley (2010–2016)
 Troy Paino (2016–present)

Student life

Traditions
UMW has many unique and interesting traditions on campus. Honor Convocation is held at the start of each academic year for incoming freshman, where they first sign the school's Honor Pledge. Similarly, Eagle Gathering is a candlelit celebration on Ball Circle that marks the start of the year and officially welcomes the newest class to UMW. Club Carnival occurs on the first week of the semester, where clubs showcase themselves for prospective members. Later in the fall semester UMW has its Family Weekend, typically held in the fall semester, where families visit the campus to get a taste of student life through events, performances and tours. Spirit Week is a series of student events that lead up to Homecoming and the return of UMW alumni to the university for athletic contests and tailgating. Senior Countdown is an event that celebrates 100 days until graduation for the undergraduate class.

In the spring semester, UMW hosts its Multicultural Fair, where it has performances, events, and global cuisines. Most notably, towards the end of the semester, UMW holds "Devil-Goat Day" where members of the Devils (students who graduate in an odd numbered year) and Goats (those who graduate in even numbered years) compete in carnival-style games on Ball Circle. The Spring Formal is an annual formal dance held in April, where students learn the location of the formal—unique each year—only once they are on the buses heading over. Mr. UMW is a unique talent show in which contestants perform to be named "Mr. UMW" by the end of the night. WMWC is the school's unlicensed student run campus radio station.

Athletics
UMW Athletics' 23 teams compete in the NCAA Division III Coast 2 Coast Conference. Known as the UMW Eagles, 308 of these student-athletes have been named to All-American teams. The university's women's rugby team won the 2014 USA Rugby Division II National Championship. UMW's men's rugby team won the USA Rugby's D1AA Fall Championship in 2017. The UMW ultimate frisbee teams have both made names for themselves as national contenders. The men’s team, Mother of George, competed for the USAU Division III College National Championship in the spring of 2018 and fall of 2021, while the women’s team, Mary Massacre, qualified for the Championship in the spring seasons of 2011, 2012, 2013, 2019, and 2022.

Clubs
The University of Mary Washington has 150 clubs these include anything from sports to hobbies. Clubs are very prominent on campus and bring a sense of community to the students of the University of Mary Washington. Examples of clubs are Ultimate Frisbee and Soccer. In the year 2021, the Men's Ultimate Frisbee team made it to the collegiate nationals in Norco, California. There are also clubs that are based on Social Justice and community outreach in the Fredericksburg area. There are also cultural-based clubs such as the Latino Student Association. The University of Mary Washington is also home to clubs that do performances such as the Eagle Bagpipe Club.

Rankings
In 2018, Peace Corps named UMW was a Top Volunteer-Producing Colleges and Universities for the tenth year in a row, ranking it fourth among small schools. A total of 261 UMW alumni have served in the Peace Corps since the agency's founding in 1961. UMW became a Peace Corps Prep Program partner in 2017.

UMW was ranked among the top 382 colleges in the nation by The Princeton Review, which featured UMW in its 2018 issue of "The Best 382 Colleges."

UMW was unranked nationally for U.S. News & World Reports 2018 college rankings, but ranked 17th in the South region.

Forbes included UMW in its 2018 "America's Top Colleges," ranking the university 276th of 660 undergraduate institutions.

In 2017, the school's debate team was ranked 43rd by the Cross Examination Debate Association. In 2009, the team ranked third overall in the National Debate Tournament.

Notable people

Alumni
 Eric Axelson, musician
 Karen Olsen Beck, former First Lady of Costa Rica
 Marguerite Bennett, comic book writer
 Jesse Benton, conservative political activist and consultant
 Marion Blakey, CEO of Rolls-Royce and former Federal Aviation Administration Administrator
 Matt Bradshaw, musician
 Mark Cole, Virginia politician
 Frances D. Cook, former U.S. Ambassador to Burundi, former U.S. Ambassador to Cameroon, former U.S. Ambassador to Oman
 Teresa A. H. Djuric, U.S. Air Force Brigadier General
 Jean Donovan, relief worker martyred in El Salvador
 Elizabeth Edwards, activist and wife of John Edwards
 Janet Doub Erickson, artist and author, founder of the Blockhouse of Boston
 Shin Fujiyama, co-founder of Students Helping Honduras
 Barbara Halliday, Mayor of Hayward, California
 Carolyn Kreiter-Foronda, Poet Laureate of Virginia, 2006–2008
 Rose M. Likins, former U.S. Ambassador to El Salvador, former U.S. Ambassador to Peru
 Michèle McQuigg, Virginia politician
 Judy Muller, journalist
 Nan Grogan Orrock, Georgia politician
 Toddy Puller, Virginia politician
 Joey Peppersack, Paralympic swimmer, represented United States at 2020 Paralympic Games
 Judge Reinhold, actor
 Anne Rudloe, marine biologist, environmentalist
 Maggie Stiefvater, writer
 Desiree Marie Velez, actress
 David Whitaker, Arkansas politician
 Christopher C. Rogers, co-creator of Halt and Catch Fire

Current, former, and emeritus faculty
 Bulent Atalay, physicist and author
 Julien Binford, artist
 David Cain, theologian
 Claudia Emerson, poet
 James Farmer (1985–1999), a leader of the Civil Rights Movement
 Ron Smith, poet
 Frank M. Snowden, Jr., scholar
 Gregory Stanton, founder and president of Genocide Watch
Laura Sumner, numismatist

References

Further reading
 Alvey, Edward (1974). History of Mary Washington College 1908–1972. University of Virginia Press. 
 Crawley, William Bryan (2008). University of Mary Washington: A Centennial History, 1908–2008. University of Mary Washington.

External links

 Official website
 Official athletics website

 
Former women's universities and colleges in the United States
University of Mary Washington
University of Mary Washington
Educational institutions established in 1908
Education in Fredericksburg, Virginia
Universities and colleges accredited by the Southern Association of Colleges and Schools
Buildings and structures in Fredericksburg, Virginia
Tourist attractions in Fredericksburg, Virginia
1908 establishments in Virginia
Public liberal arts colleges in the United States